The Zimbabwe national under-19 cricket team represents Zimbabwe in under-19 international cricket

Zimbabwe has qualified for the Under-19 Cricket World Cup on every occasion since 1998, by virtue of being a full member of the International Cricket Council (ICC).

The coach of the team for the 2022 Under-19 Cricket World Cup is Prosper Utseya, and the team captain is Emmanuel Bawa

History
Zimbabwe has made the second round of the Under-19 World Cup on three occasions – in South Africa 1998, Bangladesh 2004 and Sri Lanka 2006. In the last of those, Zimbabwe emerged from the first round undefeated, but lost easily to Pakistan in the quarter-finals.

Mluleki Nkala (1998) and Waddington Mwayenga (2002) were the equal leading wicket-takers in their respective tournaments.

Zimbabwe's worst result came at the 2012 World Cup in Australia, where the team suffered defeats to Scotland and Papua New Guinea before regaining some credibility by defeating Namibia in the play-off for 15th place.

Under-19 World Cup record

Records
All records listed are for under-19 One Day International (ODI) matches only.

Team records

Highest totals
 354/8 (50 overs), v. , at Diamond Oval, Kimberley, 2 February 2020
 321/9 (50 overs), v. , at Queen's Park Savannah, Port-of-Spain, 15 January 2022
 291/7 (50 overs), v. , at Eden Park Outer Oval, Auckland, 27 January 2002
 290/8 (48 overs), v. , at Recreation Ground, Klerksdorp, 13 January 1998
 272/8 (50 overs), v. , at Bangabandhu National Stadium, Dhaka, 27 February 2004
 272/8 (50 overs), v. , at Mainpower Oval, Rangiora, 28 January 2018

Lowest totals
 59 (27.2 overs), v. , at Institute Perguruan Temenggong Ibrahim, Johor, 24 February 2008
 63 (19.3 overs), v. , at Boland Park, Paarl, 24 January 2017
 66 (29.4 overs), v. , at Wally Wilson Oval, Cape Town, 16 January 2017
 71 (36.2 overs), v. , at Bert Sutcliffe Oval, Lincoln, 21 January 2002
 84 (40.5 overs), v. , at Zahur Ahmed Chowdhury Stadium, Chittagong, 14 November 2015

Individual records

Most career runs
 724 – Ryan Burl (2011-2014)
 710 – Wesley Madhevere (2015-2020)
 503 – Milton Shumba (2016-2020)
 458 – Ryan Murray (2015-2017)
 449 – Emmanuel Bawa (2020-2022)

Highest individual scores
 127 (145 balls) – Brendan Taylor, v. , at Bangabandhu National Stadium, Dhaka, 27 February 2004
 118 (107 balls) – Malcolm Lake, v. , at Tony Ireland Stadium, Townsville, 14 August 2012
 116* (120 balls) – Peter Moor, v. , at Harare Sports Club, Harare, 11 July 2010
 112* (? balls) – Mark Vermeulen, v. , at Recreation Ground, Klerksdorp, 13 January 1998
 105* (95 balls) – Emmanuel Bawa, v. , at North-West University No 2 Ground, Potchefstroom, 28 January 2020

Most career wickets
 42 – Wesley Madhevere (2015-2020)
 21 – Luke Jongwe (2012-2014)
 20 – Mluleki Nkala (1997-2000)
 18 – Roy Kaia (2009-2011), Natsai M'shangwe (2009-2010)

Best bowling performances
 6/31 (9 overs) – Tinashe Panyangara, v. , at Shaheed Chandu Stadium, Bogra, 18 February 2004
 5/21 (10 overs) – Waddington Mwayenga, v. , at Eden Park Outer Oval, Auckland, 27 January 2002
 5/24 (9.4 overs) – Wesley Madhevere, v. , at MA Aziz Stadium, Chittagong, 29 January 2016
 5/25 (7 overs) – David Mutendera, v. , at Recreation Ground, Klerksdorp, 13 January 1998
 5/25 (8.2 overs) – Roy Kaia, v. , at Harare Sports Club, Harare, 1 October 2009

2022 World Cup squad
Zimbabwe's squad for the 2022 World Cup in West Indies was announced on 8 December 2021.

 Emmanuel Bawa (c)
 Brian Bennett (c)
 David Bennett
 Victor Chirwa
 Mgcini Dube
 Alex Falao
 Tendekai Mataranyika
 Tashinga Makoni
 Connor Mitchell
 Steven Saul
 Matthew Schonken
 Panashe Taruvinga
 Matthew Welch
 Rogan Wolhuter
 Ngenyasha Zvinoera

References

Under-19 cricket teams
Cricket, under-19
Zimbabwe in international cricket